Tunnel injection is a field electron emission effect; specifically a quantum process called Fowler–Nordheim tunneling, whereby charge carriers are injected to an electric conductor through a thin layer of an electric insulator. 

It is used to program NAND flash memory. The process used for erasing is called tunnel release. This injection is achieved by creating a large voltage difference between the gate and the body of the MOSFET. When VGB >> 0, electrons are injected into the floating gate. When VGB << 0, electrons are forced out of the floating gate.

An alternative to tunnel injection is the spin injection.

See also 
 Hot carrier injection

References 

Quantum mechanics
Semiconductors